Mohammad Uzair (also written as Muhammad Uzair) (Urdu: محمد عذیر), was a Pakistani economist, senior bureaucrat, and professor emeritus.  He has held various public offices, and have contributed tremendously in the economic progression of Pakistan. He has written articles, books and titles on Economics, Finance, Business administration, Education, Religion, Travelogue and many others.

Biography
During his stay at Allahabad University he was class-fellow of famous Novelist Ibn-e-Safi  and 1 year senior to Mustafa Zaidi. He started his career as a Lecturer in 1951 at Dhaka University.Later he moved to Karachi. He attained his MBA Master of Business Administration, in 1956 and Doctor of Philosophy in Economics in 1960 from Wharton School of the University of Pennsylvania, Philadelphia, United States. He remained Dean & Director of Institute of Business Administration, Karachi for sometimes then left teaching and joined governmental organizations. He held key-appointments in many Financial institution of the country. He served as Additional Secretary , Ministry of Finance from 1972 to 1976, he later worked at Muslim Commercial Bank and he last served in NDFC ( National Development Financial Corporation). He retired in 1992 and re-entered the academic world and remained associated with University of Karachi and many other private educational institution as Dean and Rector. He also remained the first Dean & Project Director of Karachi University Business School. He appeared many times on Pakistan Broadcasting Corporation and Pakistan Television Corporation. He is the lifetime member of Pakistan Institute of International Affairs. In January 2015, his Autobiography was published with the name of Yaddasht .

He was one of the pioneers of interest free banking and his book " Interest Free Banking"is still considered a milestone on this topic, in 1985, Faridi, Fazlur Rahman, published an article in Journal of King Abdul Aziz University: Islamic Economics, Vol. 2, No. 2, 1985 ( please see reference ) on this book. He is also author of " Some thoughts on Economy,finance and management " which was published on January 1, 1974.

On 23 March 2016, he was awarded with the 3rd highest civil award of Pakistan, Sitara-e-Imtiaz (a distinction of excellence) in acknowledgement of his services in the field of education. Sitara-e-Imtiaz 2016  . He died on 19 Mar 2019 at Karachi at the age of 90.

References

External links
http://www.pid.gov.pk/?p=16716
https://www.express.pk/story/399109
https://www.samaa.tv/pakistan/2016/03/president-to-confer-pakistan-civil-awards/
http://educationist.com.pk/pakistan-civil-awards-2016-14-scientists-25-engineers-10-educationists-5-journalists-decorated/
Faridi, Fazlur Rahman, Mohammad Uzair, Interest Free Banking (1985). Journal of King Abdulaziz University: Islamic Economics, Vol. 2, No. 2, 1985. Available at SSRN: https://ssrn.com/abstract=3127992

1928 births
2019 deaths
Pakistani economists
Recipients of Sitara-i-Imtiaz